Koji Hashimoto may refer to:

 Koji Hashimoto (director)
 Kōji Yakusho, Japanese actor whose birth name was Koji Hashimoto
 Koji Hashimoto (footballer)